"Where We Belong" is the second single from the album The Betrayed, the fourth studio album by Welsh alternative rock band Lostprophets. It was released on 4 January 2010. Vocalist Ian Watkins commented to Kerrang!: "Where We Belong might sound really happy and catchy, but if you really listen to the lyrics I could be saying that we belong in hell."  The single reached No. 32 on the Official UK top 40 on 10 January 2010. The track was described by the band as their "love letter to being home," having written the song after returning to their native Wales after recording in Los Angeles.

Track listing

Music video
The video consists of various clips of the band performing, at the Newport Centre August 2009, and backstage, similar to the "Goodbye Tonight" video. It was the second Lostprophets video to feature drummer Luke Johnson.

Reception
"Where We Belong" was described as "the most pop orientated song they have ever recorded" by Gigwise.com writer David Renshaw, who predicted that it "could well be a massive hit for the band". It was named "Single of the Week" by FemaleFirst, who described it as an "epic new single". Chris Maguire of Altsounds predicted that the song would become "one that is going to be a sing-along" at the band's gigs. The song was described as "typically workmanlike" by Clash magazine.

Personnel

 Ian Watkins – lead vocals
 Lee Gaze – lead guitar
 Mike Lewis – rhythm guitar
 Stuart Richardson – bass guitar
 Jamie Oliver – piano, keyboard, samples, vocals
 Ilan Rubin – drums, percussion 
 Luke Johnson – drums, percussion

Chart performance

On 10 January 2010, "Where We Belong" first entered the UK Singles Chart at #32. That week, "Where We Belong" also peaked at No. 3 on the UK Indie Chart and No. 1 on the UK Rock Chart.

Charts

References

Notes
 Lostprophets news
 Watch the music video on YouTube

2010 singles
Lostprophets songs
2008 songs